Jannie Hansen  (born 6 October 1963) is a Danish footballer who played as a defender for the Denmark women's national football team. She was part of the team at the 1991 FIFA Women's World Cup and UEFA Women's Euro 1991. At the club level, she played for Rødovre BK in Denmark.

References

External links
 

1963 births
Living people
Danish women's footballers
Denmark women's international footballers
Place of birth missing (living people)
1991 FIFA Women's World Cup players
Women's association football defenders